Franco Frasi, also known as Francesco Frasi (11 January 1928 – 9 April 2009) was an Italian professional football player.

Career
Born in Rome, Frasi played for 4 seasons (44 games, 2 goals) in the Serie A for A.S. Roma, Aurora Pro Patria 1919 and Hellas Verona F.C. He scored eleven goals in 150 appearances for Hellas Verona and helped the club achieve promotion to Serie A for the first time.

References

1928 births
2009 deaths
Italian footballers
Serie A players
A.S. Roma players
Hellas Verona F.C. players
Aurora Pro Patria 1919 players
Footballers from Rome
Association football midfielders